Prime Time is a Canadian current affairs television program which aired on CBC Television from 1974 to 1975.

Premise
Film segments and interviews formed the content of Prime Time. Subjects included Israel's Moshe Dayan, magician Doug Henning and Uganda's Idi Amin. "Backlot Canada", a documentary by Peter Rowe, concerned the portrayal of Canada in American feature films. The program also included a satirical examination of Britain by Martyn Burke.

Scheduling
This hour-long program was broadcast once per month on a Tuesday at 10:00 p.m. from 12 November 1974 to 4 March 1975.

References

External links
 

1974 Canadian television series debuts
1975 Canadian television series endings
CBC Television original programming